Peronia anomala is a species of air-breathing sea slug, a shell-less marine pulmonate gastropod mollusk in the family Onchidiidae. It is the most recently discovered species of the genus of Peronia, found in the Red Sea in 1934.

Description
The sea-slug has a small pleural tooth 54μ wide, described by Labbé as "a bit like P. verruclata". Their size ranged from 10 to 5 mm in length and they have a very contacted body, almost globular. They also have thin integuments and a slightly pigmented pleural cavity.

Distribution
P. anomala lives in a marine biome sea habitat.

References

Onchidiidae
Gastropods described in 1934